"I Love Them Ho's (Ho-Wop)" is a song by American singer and songwriter Eamon. The song was released on July 26, 2004 as the second single from his debut album, I Don't Want You Back. The song was written by Eamon Doyle and Kirk Robinson, who sampled a song by the Flamingos, "I Only Have Eyes for You", which was written by Harry Warren and Al Dubin. Milk Dee produced the Eamon recording. The single version of the song, featuring Ghostface Killah, has charted in Australia, Austria, Belgium, Germany, Switzerland and the United Kingdom.

Track listing

Chart performance

Weekly charts

Release history

References

2004 singles
Eamon (singer) songs
Jive Records singles
2004 songs
Songs with music by Harry Warren
Songs with lyrics by Al Dubin
Songs written by Kirk Robinson